Helotropha leucostigma, the crescent, formerly Celaena leucostigma is a moth of the family Noctuidae. It is found in the Palearctic realm (Europe, Russia, Armenia, Turkestan, Siberia, Russian Far East, Mongolia, Amur, Korea, Japan, and northeastern China).

Technical description and variation

Forewing dull dark brown, faintly reddish- tinged; the veins powdered with grey scales; the terminal area beyond subterminal line black-brown, except at apex: median area between subcostal vein and vein 1 somewhat darker than the rest of wing; inner and outer lines indistinctly double: the inner outwardly oblique, the outer bent on vein 5; claviform stigma hardly visible; orbicular stigma oblique, elliptical, of the ground colour, with paler annulus; the reniform white or dull yellow, containing a double dark lunule with pale centre; the outer edge of this dark inner lunule is sometimes obsolete, in which case the stigma appears more solidly yellowish or white; the space between outer and subterminal lines is always slightly, often visibly, paler than the ground colour; hindwing fuscous grey; — in the ab. lunina Haw. the outer fascia is conspicuously paler, becoming pale brown or pinkish ochreous, the median vein and veins 3, 4 at their base are white, and both stigmata are more strongly marked; ab. albipuncta Tutt is comparatively a rare form, with nearly the whole reniform stigma snow-white; — fibrosa Hbn. represents a bright reddish fulvous form, which may exist, but which no one appears to have seen; — laevis Btlr. the Japanese form, is, as usual, larger than the European, and the outer line appears rather more strongly excurved beyond cell and incurved below.

Biology
The moth flies from June to October depending on location.

Larva blackish-brown; the dorsal and subdorsal lines somewhat paler; thoracic and anal plates blackish; head brown. The larvae feed on waterplants Iris pseudacorus and Cladium mariscus.

References

External links

Crescent at UKmoths
Funet Taxonomy
Lepidoptera of Belgium
Lepiforum.de
Vlindernet.nl 

Apameini
Moths described in 1808
Moths of Asia
Moths of Europe
Moths of Iceland
Moths of Japan
Taxa named by Jacob Hübner